Pavel Borisovich Yumatov (born 25 June 1974) is a former Russian football player. He is the director of the academy of FC Krylia Sovetov Samara.

External links
 

1974 births
Living people
Russian footballers
Association football forwards
Russian Premier League players
PFC Krylia Sovetov Samara players